As was the custom since 1930, the 1934 Tour de France was contested by national teams. Belgium, Italy, Germany and France each sent teams of 8 cyclists each, while Switzerland and Spain sent a combined team of eight cyclists. In addition, there were 20 individual cyclists; other than in 1933, they were no longer racing under the nomer "touriste-routier" but as "individuel". In total this made 60 cyclists. Split up in nationalities, there were 20 French, 12 Belgian, 12 Italian, 8 German, 4 Spanish and 4 Swiss cyclists.

The French team of 1934 consisted of all good riders, with the core of the team being the winner of 1933, Georges Speicher, Roger Lapébie, former winner Antonin Magne and Maurice Archambaud, who had performed well in 1933. The French selectors were criticized for selecting René Vietto, a twenty-year-old rider who had only won some small races. The Italian team now included Giuseppe Martano, who had ridden as a touriste-routier in 1933. The Belgian team, which normally included some big contenders, was lackluster.

By team

By rider

By nationality

References

1934 Tour de France
1934